The Women's 10m Platform event at the 2010 South American Games was held on March 21 at 14:30.

Medalists

Results

References
Summary

10m W